Seo District (Seo-gu) is a gu ("district") of Daejeon, South Korea.  Daejeon Metropolitan City Hall is also located there.

Administrative divisions 
Seo-gu is divided into 14 dong (동, "neighborhoods"):
 Gasuwon-dong
 Gwanjeo-dong
 Giseong-dong
 Wolpyeong-dong
 Nae-dong
 Gajang-dong
 Goejeong-dong
 Dunsan-dong
 Sancheon-dong
 Tanbang-dong
 Yongmun-dong
 Byeon-dong
 Boksu-dong
 Doma-dong

Places of Interest
Dunsan-dong is one of the more densely populated areas of Daejeon. As a result, it is the location of several points of interest. These include department stores, government offices, and several international chain restaurants and retailers. There is Pai Chai University in Seo District, Daejeon. There is also Hanbat Arboretum. There is also the "Cafe Wave". There is an Art Center. Jangtae Recreational Forest is located in the district.

See also
Daejeon Gwanjeo High School

References

External links 
 Official website